Black Oxen is a 1923 American  silent fantasy / romantic drama film starring Corinne Griffith, Conway Tearle, and Clara Bow. Directed by Frank Lloyd, the film is based on the controversial best-selling 1923 novel of the same name by Gertrude Atherton.

Described as "subtle science fiction", the film takes its title from William Butler Yeats: "The years like great Black Oxen tread the world." It was produced by Frank Lloyd Productions and distributed by First National Pictures. A special Photoplay Edition of the novel was published by A. L. Burt Company, New York, illustrated with four stills from the film.

Plot
As described in a film magazine review, having submitted to a medical treatment which restores her youth and beauty using a rejuvenating glandular treatment and X-ray surgery, Madame Zatianny, formerly Mary Ogden of New York City, leaves Austria for the United States. Young playwright Lee Clavering meets the rejuvenated Mary and, taken by her perfect poise and serene beauty, falls in love with her. Janet Oglethorpe, an animated and precocious flapper, is also in love with Lee but he has not yet taken notice of her. Mary and Lee make plans to marry. One of Madame's former lovers, Prince Rohenhauer, arrives and convinces her of the folly of this match. In a final meeting, she makes a break with Clavering and returns to Austria. In the end, Lee discovers happiness with Janet as they ride away in a taxicab.

Cast

Advertisement of the film 
In 1923 motion picture industry magazine promotions, Corinne Griffith was used to advertise the movie because she was a known star and considered one of the most beautiful actresses in cinema. Publications also used the W. B. Yeats couplet, "The years like Great Black Oxen tread the world // And God the herdsman goads them on behind." That is quoted on the title page of the novel in its first edition and at the opening of the film.

Preservation
The George Eastman House retains a print of the film which is incomplete, comprising the first seven reels, but not the eighth. In 2010, it undertook restoration of the 35mm print, funded by The National Film Preservation Fund. The Gosfilmofond Russian State Archive also holds an incomplete copy, consisting of all reels with the exception of Reel 2. The New York Public Library has a 16mm print available in three film reels. A 60-minute version mastered by eBay retailer  Buyers’ Gallery Video is available on DVD. No complete version of the film is currently commercially available 

Black Oxen is one of about ten out of 58 films starring Corinne Griffith that are available for viewing.

References

External links

 
 
 Black Oxen (print) at Fantastic Fiction – some publications with cover images
 Black Oxen at Project Gutenberg – transcript of Photoplay Edition with photo illustrations from the film (HTML format contains linked images)
 Stills at silenthollywood.com
 Theater advertisement at www.silentfilmstillarchive.com
 

1923 films
1923 romantic drama films
1920s romantic fantasy films
American romantic drama films
American silent feature films
American black-and-white films
Films set in New York City
Films about nobility
Films based on American novels
Films based on fantasy novels
Films directed by Frank Lloyd
1920s science fiction films
American romantic fantasy films
Films based on works by Gertrude Atherton
Flappers
1920s American films
Silent romantic drama films
Silent American drama films
Silent science fiction films